Ann Henning Jocelyn (born 1948) is a Swedish-born playwright, translator and author, based in Ireland since the 1980s.

Biography
Ann Margareta Maria Henning was born in Gothenburg in 1948.  She was raised in Dalsland, on the Norwegian border, and Molndal, outside Gothenburg. While in school she discovered that her love of literature got her bullied, but her ability to write plays which entertained her classmates ensured that even her worst bully was more interested in her next work. 

She went on to attend Gothenburg University in 1968, where she got a degree in classical architecture and drama. On graduation she got a job there as a junior lecturer in art history. But Jocelyn decided she didn't want to settle down and went to London to study theatre at Studio 68. When she left school there Jocelyn got a position in the Open Space Theatre in London, working with Charles Marowitz. 

When getting a permit to work in London proved to be more difficult than she had hoped, Jocelyn began to work translating plays and novels, adding a degree in English to her skills. She worked with Ingrid Bergman on translating her novel into Swedish.

In 1982, Jocelyn moved to her current home of Doonreagan House in Connemara. The owner of the house, Robert Jocelyn, 10th Earl of Roden, had lent it to her to work on a book. They married on 13 February 1986, and have a son, Shane Robert Henning Jocelyn, Viscount Jocelyn, heir to the title Earl of Roden. As a result of her husband's title, Jocelyn is Countess of Roden. 

When they discovered that Ted Hughes had lived in the house she ended up working on her play Doonreagan, about the period when Ted Hughes and his partner Assia Wevill lived there.

Bibliography

Books
 Life Harvest, 2021
 The Sphere of Light, 2019
 Only Our Own, 2014
 Doonreagan, 2013
 Keylines for Living, 2007
 Keylines, 2000
 The Cosmos and You, 1995
 Honeylove the Bearcub, 1995
 The Connemara Champion, 1994
 The Connemara Stallion, 1991
 The Connemara Whirlwind, 1990

Plays
 Smile, Sweden, 1972
 Baptism of Fire, Ireland 1997, Pernik, Bulgaria 1999
 The Alternative, Ireland and U.K.,1998
 Becoming the Tree, adapted from the book by Jill Teck, Ireland 1999
 Doonreagan, Cashel 2013, London 2013, Cambridge 2013, Clifden 2015, Galway 2015, Dublin 2015
 Only Our Own, Dublin 2012, London 2014, Eastbourne 2015, Galway 2015, Dublin 2015
 The Sphere of Light, Cambridge, 2017

References and sources

1948 births
People from Gothenburg
People from County Galway
Swedish translators
20th-century Swedish dramatists and playwrights
Living people
Swedish women dramatists and playwrights
21st-century Swedish dramatists and playwrights